T-License is the license used by T-Engine Forum for distributing T-Kernel and μT-Kernel source code. License fee is free if products are developed according to T-License conditions. According to the first version of T-License, changing or modifying the T-Kernel source code can only be done by certain parties like A-level members of the T-Engine Forum and these parties must notify and register their changes with the T-Engine Forum.
But this restriction has been mostly lifted since the 2.0 version, which is in force since May, 2011.

See also
TRON Project
T-Engine
T-Kernel

References

External links 
 T-License
 TRON Forum
 The Most Popular Operating System in the World

Software licenses
TRON project